Reuben Ewing  (born Reuben Cohen on November 30, 1899) was a Jewish Ukrainian-American baseball player for the St. Louis Cardinals.

Early life
Ewing (then Cohen) was born in Odessa, Russian Empire to Jewish-Ukrainian parents and emigrated with them to the United States in 1904, and was Jewish. As a child he showed brilliant athletic talent, a foreshadow of his later achievement of making the major leagues. In order to avoid anti-semitism Cohen became "Ewing". He later attended Hartford High School and Lebanon Valley College.

Professional career
In 1921, while still a student at Lebanon Valley, Reuben received a contract with the St. Louis Cardinals. His short career featured no highlights and lasted only three games and spanned only seven days from June 21 to June 27.

In the only plate appearance of his professional career, he was struck out by future Hall of Fame pitcher Eppa Rixey while pinch hitting for pitcher Tink Riviere.

References

External links

1899 births
1970 deaths
American people of Ukrainian-Jewish descent
Jewish American baseball players
Jewish Major League Baseball players
Major League Baseball shortstops
Major League Baseball players from Ukraine
People from West Hartford, Connecticut
Emigrants from the Russian Empire to the United States
Jews from the Russian Empire
Ukrainian Jews
Sportspeople from Odesa
St. Louis Cardinals players
20th-century American Jews
Baseball players from Connecticut
Lebanon Valley College alumni